This is the discography for West Coast hip hop group, Compton's Most Wanted.

Albums

Studio albums

 Singles: Raw

Compilation albums

Singles

Music videos

References

Hip hop discographies